Thomas Sydney Andrew "Syd" Luyt (11 December 1925 – 4 June 2010) was a South African long-distance runner. He competed in the marathon at the 1948 Summer Olympics and the 1952 Summer Olympics.

References

1925 births
2010 deaths
Athletes (track and field) at the 1948 Summer Olympics
Athletes (track and field) at the 1952 Summer Olympics
South African male long-distance runners
South African male marathon runners
Olympic athletes of South Africa
Athletes (track and field) at the 1950 British Empire Games
Commonwealth Games silver medallists for South Africa
Commonwealth Games medallists in athletics
Sportspeople from Germiston
Medallists at the 1950 British Empire Games